Pisky is a village located in Lviv Raion (district) of Lviv Oblast (province) in western Ukraine. It belongs to Velykyi Liubin settlement hromada, one of the hromadas of Ukraine.

Until 18 July 2020, Pisky belonged to Horodok Raion. The raion was abolished in July 2020 as part of the administrative reform of Ukraine, which reduced the number of raions of Lviv Oblast to seven. The area of Horodok Raion was merged into Lviv Raion.

The name in Ukrainian can be interpreted literally as "the Sands".

The recent estimated population is 72.

References

External links
 Verkhovna Rada of Ukraine
 Weather in Pisky

Villages in Lviv Raion